Famous Blue Raincoat: The Songs of Leonard Cohen is the sixth studio album recorded by the American singer Jennifer Warnes. It debuted on the Billboard 200 on February 14, 1987, and peaked at No. 72 in the US Billboard chart, No.33 in the UK albums chart, and No.8 in Canada. Originally released by Cypress Records (RCA Records in the UK), it was reissued by Private Music after Cypress went out of business.  It is the only Jennifer Warnes album to make the UK albums chart (up to September 2014).

Background
Released in November 1986, Famous Blue Raincoat is a tribute to Leonard Cohen, with whom Warnes had toured as a backup singer in the 1970s. The album's songs span much of Cohen's career, from his 1969 album Songs from a Room to his 1984 album Various Positions (on which Warnes sang), and even two songs ("First We Take Manhattan" and "Ain't No Cure for Love") from Cohen's then-unreleased album I'm Your Man.

The idea for the album originated when Cohen assisted Warnes with the lyrics of "Song of Bernadette" while on tour in 1979. Warnes had suggested the album at Arista Records and later MCA Records with no luck. The album's producer, C. Roscoe Beck said, "Leonard seemed to be A&R poison."

Guest contributors include guitarists Stevie Ray Vaughan, David Lindley and Robben Ford, drummer Vinnie Colaiuta, keyboardist Russell Ferrante, arranger Van Dyke Parks and Cohen himself duetting on "Joan of Arc".

The album is the first record produced by Roscoe Beck. The liner notes include a cartoon by Cohen of a torch being passed with the caption, "Jenny Sings Lenny."

In August 2007, a remastered and expanded 20th anniversary edition was released by Private Music with four bonus tracks.

Reception 

Writing retrospectively for Allmusic, music critic William Ruhlmann wrote of the album
Where other singers tended to geld Cohen's often disturbingly revealing poetry, Warnes, working with the composer himself and introducing a couple of great new songs ("First We Take Manhattan" and "Song of Bernadette," which she co-wrote), matched his own versions. The high point may have been the Warnes-Cohen duet on "Joan of Arc," but the album was consistently impressive... For Warnes, the album meant her first taste of real critical success: suddenly a singer who had seemed like a second-rate Linda Ronstadt now appeared to be a first-class interpretive artist.
In reviewing the reissue, Steve Horowitz of PopMatters noted, "This anniversary edition... may finally give the album the acclaim it initially deserved." Peter Gerstenzanga of The Village Voice wrote after the reissue,
As much as one admires Warnes's taste in songwriters, the unadorned truth is that Cohen's dark, grave voice is a better instrument for his songs. Also, his original arrangements—from solo-guitar bare to brass-band ironic—are more fitting than the slick stuff here. Stevie Ray Vaughn playing processed blues licks on "First We Take Manhattan"? Inappropriate. Smoky sax on the title track? It's a meditation on betrayal and revenge, not a lounge song. Furthermore, Warnes's melismas (think a less histrionic Ronstadt) sound sweet, not murderous.

Track listing
All songs written by Leonard Cohen except where noted.
 "First We Take Manhattan" – 3:47
 "Bird on a Wire" – 4:42
 "Famous Blue Raincoat" – 5:33
 "Joan of Arc" – 7:57
 "Ain't No Cure for Love" – 3:21
 "Coming Back to You" – 3:43
 "Song of Bernadette" (Jennifer Warnes, Bill Elliott, Cohen) - 3:55
 "A Singer Must Die" – 4:52
 "Came So Far for Beauty" (Cohen, John Lissauer) - 3:37
Additional tracks on 20th anniversary reissue
"Night Comes On" [New Recording]
"Ballad of the Runaway Horse" [New Recording]
"If It Be Your Will" [New Recording]
"Joan of Arc" [Live in Antwerp, Belgium, 1992]

Charts

Year-end charts

Personnel

Jennifer Warnes – vocals, harmony vocals
Leonard Cohen – vocals (on "Joan of Arc"), sketches
Roscoe Beck – bass, fretless bass, synthesizer, guitar
Larry Brown – tambourine, shakers
William D. "Smitty" Smith – synthesizer, Hammond organ
Jorge Calderón – bass
Lenny Castro – percussion
Gary Chang – synthesizer, programming, synthesizer arrangements
Vinnie Colaiuta – drums
Larry Corbett	 – cello
Russell Ferrante – piano, synthesizer
Richard Feves – bass
Robben Ford – guitar
Van Dyke Parks – synthesizer, accordion, arranger
Michael Landau – guitar
David Lindley – lap steel guitar
Fred Tackett – guitar
Stevie Ray Vaughan – guitar
Steve Forman – percussion
Bill Ginn – synthesizer, piano, percussion, arranger, conductor
Kal David – background vocals
George Ball – background vocals
Terry Evans – background vocals
Willie Green, Jr. – background vocals
William "Bill" Greene – background vocals
Bobby King – background vocals
Arnold McCuller – background vocals
Joseph Powell – background vocals
David Lasley – background vocals
Tim Stone – background vocals
Greg Prestopino – background vocals
Sharon Robinson – background vocals
Reverend Dave Boruff – saxophone
Paul Ostermayer – tenor saxophone
Novi Novog – viola
Suzie Katayama – cello
Sid Page – violin
Barbara Porter – violin

Additional personnel
Engineers – Csaba Petocz, Tim Boyle, Steven Strassman, Paul Brown, Larry Brown, Frank Wolf
Assistant engineers – Jeff Park, Nyya Lark, Terry Dunavan, Ken Fowler, Dan Reed, Sharon Rice, Garth Richardson, Duane Seykora, Russ Bracher, Joel Stoner
Mixing – George Massenburg, Larry Brown, Frank Wolf, Billy Youdelman
Mastering – Bernie Grundman
Programming – Chuck Barth, Todd Yyega
Art Direction – Jennifer Warnes, Leslie Wintner
Reissue design – Patricia Bukur

Certifications

References

External links
Album info at Leonard Cohen Files website.

1987 albums
Leonard Cohen tribute albums
Private Music albums
Jennifer Warnes albums